= City Estate of N. A. Sumarokov — N. A. Tyuliaeva =

Building in Moscow, Russia

- Городская усадьба Н. А. Сумарокова — Н. А. Тюляевой
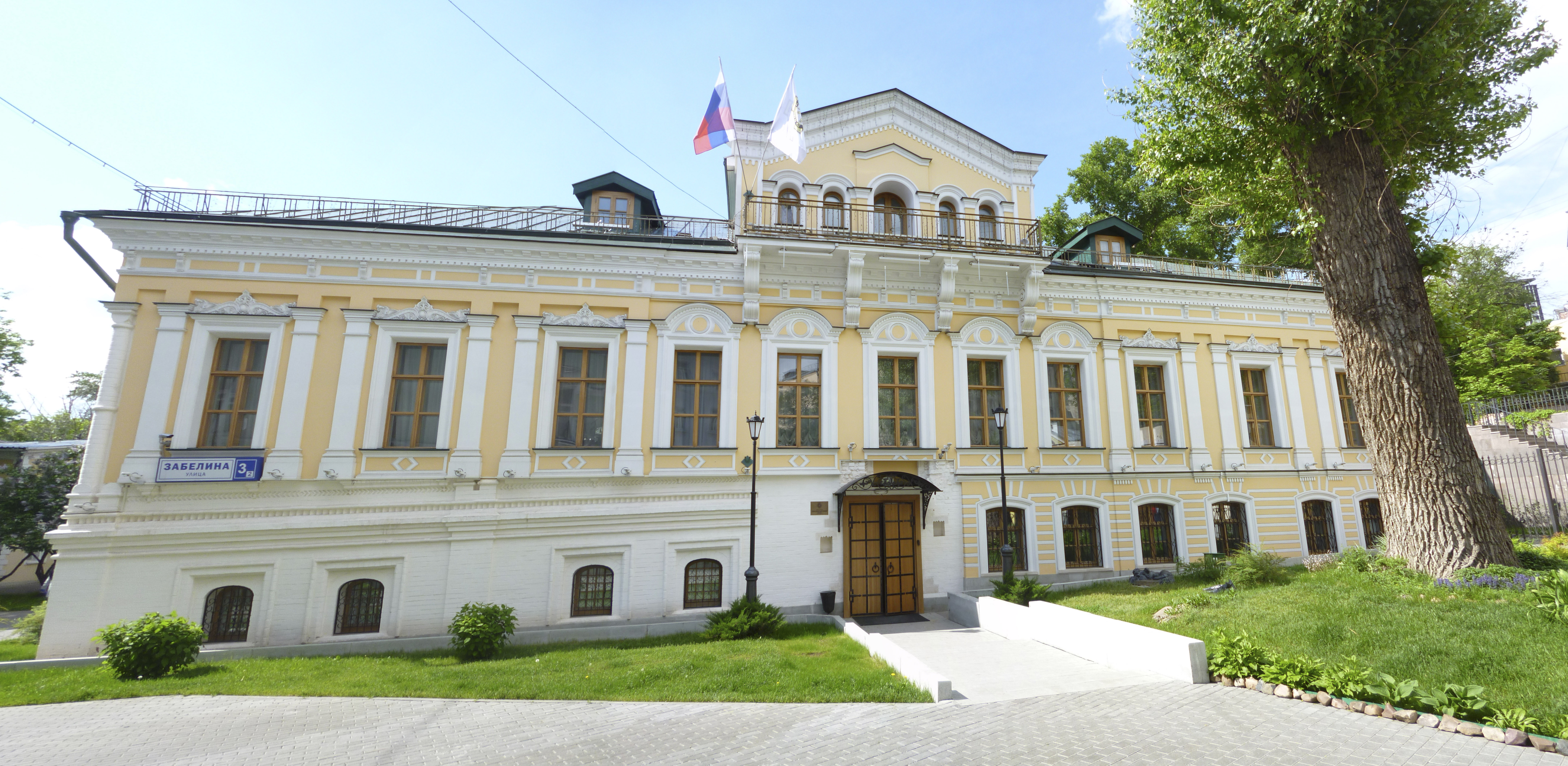
- Interactive map of City Estate of N. A. Sumarokov — N. A. Tyuliaeva
- Location: Moscow, Zabelina St., 3

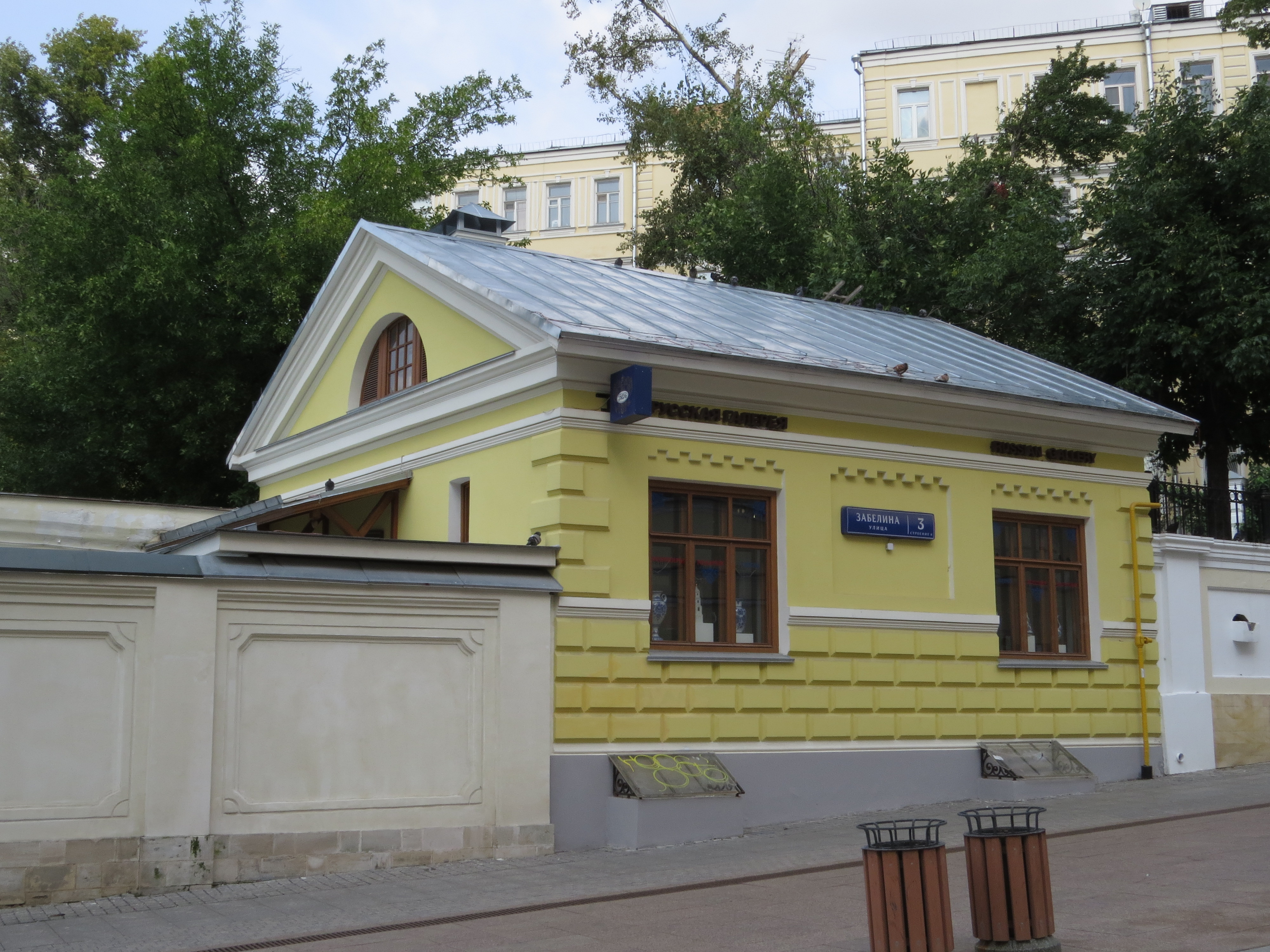
Outbuilding (lodge)

The City Estate of N. A. Sumarokov — N. A. Tyuliaeva is a building in the center of Moscow (Zabelina St., 3). At the heart of the building is the 17th century chambers. Currently, the building is occupied by the Imperial Orthodox Palestinian Society. The city manor has the status of an object of cultural heritage of regional significance.

== History ==
Now the existing building was built on the basis of chambers of the 17th century, which are reminiscent of the platbands on the left side. The plat bands are made in the form of a "Christmas tree", which echoes the design of the southern facade of the neighboring church of St. Prince Vladimir in Old Sadekh. Thus we can assume that the design of the chambers was occupied by the same architects who rebuilt the Vladimir Church in the second half of the 17th century.

The building was rebuilt many times. In the middle of the 18th century, the chambers belonged to the secretary of the provincial chancellery A. P. Kazakov, who made an extension to them on the right. In the late 18th and early 19th centuries the house belonged to Captain Grigory Pavlovitch Rzhevsky. Then the house was owned by the foreman Nikolai Andreevich Sumarokov, who rented it out. Later, the house belonged to merchants, and then to N. A. Tyuliaeva.

In the 1980s, the building housed the Moscow State Historical and Archival Institute (now part of the RSUH). In 2001-2007, according to the project of E. K. Rukavishnikova and NG Tumanova, the restoration of the building was carried out. Some elements of the decor of the chambers of the 17th century were restored, the interiors were renovated, engineering networks were reconstructed. During the restoration work, the facade of the building was completely rebuilt, which led to criticism from the city protection organizations. Nevertheless, in 2012 the works were awarded the "Moscow Restoration" award in the nomination "For the best restoration project and/or for the best project of adaptation to modern use".

Since 2010, the building has been occupied by the Imperial Orthodox Palestinian Society. A bust in honour of the founder of the society Vasily Nikolaevich Khitrovo by the sculptor Alexander Ivanovich Rukavishnikov was installed in front of the building on 3 June 2012. In 2013, on the ground floor, a museum of the Imperial Orthodox Palestinian Society was opened.
